Artix is a railway station in Artix, Nouvelle-Aquitaine, France. The station is located on the Toulouse - Bayonne railway line. The station is served by TER (local) services operated by the SNCF.

Train services
The following services currently call at Artix:
local service (TER Nouvelle-Aquitaine) Bordeaux - Dax - Pau - Tarbes
local service (TER Nouvelle-Aquitaine) Bayonne - Pau - Tarbes

References

Railway stations in Pyrénées-Atlantiques